The Berd is a river in Russia, a right tributary of the Ob.

The Berd begins on the western slopes of the Salair ridge, flows  in Altai Krai territory and the rest in Novosibirsk Oblast. The river empties into the Novosibirsk Reservoir, which submerged  of the original Berd river after construction.

The Ik is a tributary flowing into it from the north. Another river flowing into it is the Anfimov Mocheg.

Discharge averages . Ice forms on the river in the first weeks of November and breaks apart in mid-April.

Naming, it is thought, is from Turkic languages "Berdi" with the meaning of "given".

Two cities, Berdsk and Iskitim, are along the river.

References

External links 
 "Variety of the underwater and maritime vegetation for Berd river", "Some ecological problems of the Berd river and their solution approach", P.M.Kipriyanova 

 
Rivers of Novosibirsk Oblast
Rivers of Altai Krai